Monarthrocarpus is a genus of flowering plants belonging to the family Fabaceae.

Its native range is Madagascar, Southeastern India, Central Malesia to New Guinea.

Species:

Monarthrocarpus dolabriformis 
Monarthrocarpus securiformis

References

Desmodieae
Fabaceae genera